Myrmica kotokui is a species of ant of the genus Myrmica.

This species closely resembles the European Myrmica ruginodis and is perhaps not a separate distinctive species. Onoyama (1989) suggested that it might best be treated as a subspecies of M. ruginodis.

References

External links
Myrmica kotokui from the Japanese ant colour image database

Myrmica
Insects described in 1976